The bad boy is a cultural archetype that is variously defined, and is often used synonymously with the historic terms rake or cad: a male who behaves badly, especially within societal norms.

Definitions
The stereotypical "bad guy" was described by Kristina Grish in her book Addickted as "the irresistible rogue who has the dizzying ability to drive women wild" with a "laissez-faire attitude about life and love".

An article in The Independent compared the term "bad boys" with men who had a particular combination of personality traits, sometimes referred to as a "dark triad" of Machiavellian traits, and reported that a study found that such men were likely to have a greater number of sexual affairs.

See also
Boy next door (stock character)
Chad (slang)
Dark triad
Nice guy
Playboy (lifestyle)
Tall, dark and handsome
Toxic masculinity

References

Archetypes
Male stock characters
Stereotypes of men
Terms for men
Interpersonal relationships